Suriname Olympic Committee (IOC code: SUR) is the National Olympic Committee representing Suriname.

Logo

External links 
  Official website
 Suriname Olympic Committee

Suriname
Olympic Committee
Suriname at the Olympics
1959 establishments in Suriname